Benton Township is a township in Fulton County, Arkansas, United States. Its total population was 2,564 as of the 2010 United States Census, an increase of 3.26 percent from 2,483 at the 2000 census.

According to the 2010 Census, Benton Township is located at  (36.372416, -91.848591).

The city of Salem is located within the township.

References

External links 

Townships in Arkansas
Populated places in Fulton County, Arkansas